The 2013–14 San Miguel Beermen season was the 39th season of the franchise in the Philippine Basketball Association (PBA). The team was known as the Petron Blaze Boosters for the duration of the Philippine Cup.

Key dates
November 3: The 2013 PBA Draft took place in Midtown Atrium, Robinson Place Manila.
January 13: San Miguel Corporation president Ramon S. Ang announced that the team will revert to its iconic name "San Miguel Beermen" starting the 2014 PBA Commissioner's Cup.

Draft picks

Rosters

Philippine Cup

Eliminations

Standings

Game log

Playoffs

Bracket

Commissioner's Cup

Eliminations

Standings

Game log

Playoffs

Bracket

Governors' Cup

Eliminations

Standings

Bracket

Game log

Transactions

Trades

Pre-season

Recruited imports

References

San Miguel Beermen seasons
San Miguel